Robert Deas (17 September 1886 – 1 April 1960) was an Australian rules footballer who played with South Melbourne in the Victorian Football League (VFL).

After kicking four goals on his debut in the opening round of the 1909 season, Deas played every game that year up until the club's second final. He was recalled however for the 1909 Grand Final where he played as a centre-half forward in a two-point win. He finished the year with 29 goals and kicked a further 26 the following season. From 1912 onwards he was used as a fullback and played in South Melbourne's losing Grand Final teams of 1912 and 1914.

Notes

References
Holmesby, Russell and Main, Jim (2007). The Encyclopedia of AFL Footballers. 7th ed. Melbourne: Bas Publishing.

External links

CricketArchive: Robert Deas

1886 births
1960 deaths
Australian rules footballers from Melbourne
Australian Rules footballers: place kick exponents
Leopold Football Club (MJFA) players
Sydney Swans players
Sydney Swans Premiership players
One-time VFL/AFL Premiership players
People from Port Melbourne